The Volunteer Defence Corps (VDC) was an Australian part-time volunteer military force of World War II modelled on the British Home Guard. The VDC was established in July 1940 by the Returned and Services League of Australia (RSL) and was initially composed of ex-servicemen who had served in World War I. The government took over control of the VDC in May 1941, and gave the organisation the role of training for guerrilla warfare, collecting local intelligence and providing static defence of each unit's home area. General Harry Chauvel, who had retired in 1930, was recalled to duty in 1940 and appointed Inspector-General of the VDC. Chauvel held this position until his death in March 1945.

Following the outbreak of the Pacific War, the Government expanded the VDC in February 1942. Membership was open to men aged between 18 and 60, including those working in reserved occupations. As a result, there were, by 1944, nearly 100,000 men in the VDC, organized into 111 battalions consisting of about 1,500 full-time personnel, over 30,000 part-time active members and over 43,000 part-time reserve members of the Volunteer Defence Corps.

As the perceived threat to Australia declined the VDC's role changed from static defence to operating anti-aircraft artillery, coastal artillery and searchlights. Members of inland VDC units were freed from having to attend regular training in May 1944 and the VDC was officially disbanded on 24 August 1945.

Gallery

See also
Auxiliary Units

References

External links

Military units and formations of Australia in World War II
Infantry units and formations of Australia
Military units and formations established in 1940
Military units and formations disestablished in 1945
Militias in Oceania
Civil defense
Volunteering in Australia